Richard Harvey Solomon (June 19, 1937 – March 13, 2017) was an American diplomat and academic who served as Director of Policy Planning from 1986 to 1989, Assistant Secretary of State for East Asian and Pacific Affairs from 1989 to 1992, and U.S. Ambassador to the Philippines from 1992 to 1993. In September 1993, he became president of the United States Institute of Peace, a position he held until September 2012. He subsequently joined the RAND Corporation as a Senior Fellow.

Early life and education

Richard H. Solomon was born in Philadelphia, Pennsylvania on June 28, 1937. He earned a Bachelor of Science degree in Chemistry from Massachusetts Institute of Technology in 1960, and a PhD in political science with a specialization in Chinese politics in 1966.

Career 
In 1966, Solomon became a professor of political science at the University of Michigan. He left in 1971 to become a staff member of the United States National Security Council, responsible for Asian Affairs. In this position, he worked with then-National Security Advisor Henry Kissinger on the normalization of relations with China.

In 1976, he joined the Rand Corporation in Santa Monica, California as head of the political science department, a position he held until 1986. Solomon then joined the United States Department of State in 1986 as Director of Policy Planning, serving until 1989.

On March 24, 1989, President of the United States George H. W. Bush nominated Solomon as Assistant Secretary of State for East Asian and Pacific Affairs serving from June 23, 1989 until July 10, 1992. As Assistant Secretary, Solomon helped negotiate the 1991 Paris Peace Agreements, by which the Vietnam-backed People's Republic of Kampuchea agreed to turn over control of Cambodia to the United Nations Transitional Authority in Cambodia, an international peacekeeping force (with Cambodia gaining independence in 1995). Solomon also facilitated nuclear proliferation discussions between North Korea and South Korea. He played a role in the formation of the Asia-Pacific Economic Cooperation initiative. He also participated in bilateral negotiations with Vietnam, Mongolia, and Japan.

President George H. W. Bush nominated Solomon as United States Ambassador to the Philippines. He was confirmed and served in that role from September 4, 1992 until March 1, 1993.

Solomon left government service in 1993, becoming president of the United States Institute of Peace. He served in that role until September 2012. In October of that year he returned to the RAND Corporation as a senior fellow.

Solomon published eight books, including "Mao's Revolution and the Chinese Political Culture" (1971, 1999), "A Revolution is Not a Dinner Party" (1975), "The China Factor" (1981), "Chinese Negotiating Behavior" (1985 and 2000), "Exiting Indochina" (2000), "American Negotiating Behavior" (2007), and "Peace Building" (2012). He served as a member of Partnership for a Secure America's bipartisan advisory board until his death in 2017. The Partnership is a non-profit organization dedicated to rebuilding the bipartisan center in American foreign policy and national security.

Solomon received the honorary Doctor of Humane Letters (L.H.D.) from Whittier College in 2012.

Death 
Solomon died on March 13, 2017, at his home in Bethesda, Maryland from brain cancer at the age of 79.

References

External links
 President Bush's nomination of Solomon as Assistant Secretary of State for East Asian and Pacific Affairs
 Profile from the United States Institute of Peace
 Richard Solomon, Kissinger aide involved in ‘Ping-Pong diplomacy’ with China, dies at 79

1937 births
2017 deaths
Writers from Philadelphia
20th-century American Jews
Directors of Policy Planning
Assistant Secretaries of State for East Asian and Pacific Affairs
Ambassadors of the United States to the Philippines
Massachusetts Institute of Technology School of Science alumni
University of Michigan faculty
RAND Corporation people
Deaths from brain cancer in the United States
Deaths from cancer in Maryland
MIT School of Humanities, Arts, and Social Sciences alumni
21st-century American Jews
20th-century American diplomats